Jane Elizabeth Mary Fallon (born 9 December 1960) is an English author and television producer.

Early life and education 
Born as the youngest of five children in Harrow, northwest London, Fallon's family moved to Buckinghamshire when she was a child, and she grew up in a house above her parents' newsagent's shop. 

She was educated at St Bernard's Convent School in Slough, Berkshire, and University College London, where she studied history, graduating with a bachelor of arts in 1982. Alongside her studies, she started writing for the history department's magazine, for the university newspaper, London Student, and for Pi Magazine.

Career
After her studies, she began working for a theatrical literary agency. After a few years there, she decided to become a freelance script reader and script editor for different theatrical productions and television, and in 1994, she advanced to become a producer on the series EastEnders. This was followed by a number of awarded series, such as This Life, 20 Things to Do Before You're 30, and Teachers.

By 2006, Fallon had decided to leave television and become a full-time novelist. A year later, she debuted with her first national bestseller, Getting Rid of Matthew. She has followed this with Got You Back, Foursome, The Ugly Sister, Skeletons, Strictly Between Us, My Sweet Revenge, Faking Friends, Tell Me a Secret, Queen Bee, Worst. Idea. Ever. and Just Got Real. Her books have been translated into more than 20 languages.

Her novel Got You Back is being made into a musical, with music by Swedish pop group Roxette and a world premiere scheduled for Malmö Opera, Sweden in 2024. 

In 2011, Foursome was nominated for the Melissa Nathan Award for Romantic Comedy Fiction and in 2018, Faking Friends was nominated in the popular fiction category of the National Book Awards. In 2019, it was longlisted for the Comedy Women in Print Prize. In 2020 she was awarded an honorary fellowship of University College London.

Personal life
Fallon has been in a relationship with comedian Ricky Gervais since 1982; they met while studying at University College London. The couple have lived together since 1984 and reside in Hampstead. Fallon's niece, Elsie Fallon, is an actress.

Filmography (producer)
 EastEnders (1985–1994)
 This Life (1996–1997)
 Undercover Heart (1998)
 Massive Landmarks of the 20th Century (1999)
 Teachers (2001)
 20 Things to Do Before You're 30 (2002)
 Single (2003)

Bibliography
 Getting Rid of Matthew (2007)
 Got You Back (2008)
 Foursome (2010)
 The Ugly Sister (2011)
 Skeletons (2014)
 Strictly Between Us (2016)
 My Sweet Revenge (2017)
 Faking Friends (2018)
 Tell Me a Secret (2019)
 Queen Bee (2020)
 Worst. Idea. Ever. (2021)
 Just Got Real (2022)

References

External links
 
 

1960 births
People from Harrow, London
Writers from London
Living people
Alumni of University College London
BBC television producers
British women television producers
English women novelists
People educated at St Bernard's Catholic Grammar School
21st-century English women writers
21st-century English writers
Ricky Gervais